Samiuela Tevi (born November 15, 1994) is an American football offensive tackle who is a free agent. He played college football at Utah, and was drafted by the Los Angeles Chargers in the sixth round of the 2017 NFL Draft.

College career
Tevi played college football at Utah. There, he played in 48 games for the Utes football team.

Professional career

Los Angeles Chargers
Tevi was drafted by the Los Angeles Chargers in the sixth round, 190th overall, in the 2017 NFL Draft. He played in 14 games as rookie, starting one at left tackle in place of the injured Russell Okung.

Tevi entered 2018 as a backup tackle to starters Russell Okung and Joe Barksdale. He made his first start of the season in Week 2 at right tackle in place of an injured Barksdale. He remained the starter the rest of the season after ultimately replacing Barksdale when he returned from injury and was subsequently released.

Indianapolis Colts 
On March 24, 2021, Tevi signed a one-year deal with the Indianapolis Colts. He suffered a torn ACL in the preseason and was placed on injured reserve on August 30, 2021.

References

External links
Utah Utes bio

1994 births
Living people
American football offensive tackles
American people of Tongan descent
Indianapolis Colts players
Los Angeles Chargers players
People from Euless, Texas
Players of American football from Texas
Sportspeople from the Dallas–Fort Worth metroplex
Utah Utes football players